Manhattanization is a neologism coined to describe the construction of many tall or densely situated buildings, which transforms the appearance and character of a city to what is similar to Manhattan, the most densely populated borough of New York City.  It was a pejorative word used by critics of the highrise buildings built in San Francisco during the 1960s and 1970s, who claimed the skyscrapers would block views of the bay and the surrounding hills. With careful urban planning, the phenomenon became more accepted in time. The term also gained usage as a buzzword for high-density developments in Las Vegas, Los Angeles, Dubai, and Miami in the early 2000s and again in the 2010s. Another example is the high rise development in Toronto since 2007, as well as rapid development of skyscrapers in Hong Kong and Tokyo since the 1990s, eventually allowing the city to possess more skyscrapers than New York. The term has even been applied to many smaller US cities that have seen a large spike in downtown high rise rental buildings since the 21st century. Nonetheless, these cities would have to multiply their populations many times over to match the population density of Manhattan, though this is a biased comparison between a city and a district, as even the other four "outer boroughs" of New York City would have to nearly triple in population to match Manhattan's current density.

Frankfurt

"Mainhattan" is a term referring to Frankfurt's skyline, especially that of its central business district, the Bankenviertel. The word is a portmanteau of Main, the river on which Frankfurt lies, and Manhattan, a reference to the inner city area's visually impressive high rises and skyscrapers, a special feature for a European city.

The first tall buildings were built in the 1960s. Originally, the expression was sometimes used derisively, but the connotation has changed to a positive one.

Miami

The term "Manhattanization" has been used to describe the 2003–2008 boom of real estate developments in Miami that brought the construction of more than 50 high rise buildings throughout the city. As conditions in Latin America destabilized, many of Latin America's elites sought refuge in the city, especially in the Brickell area where Latin American money flows into many of the construction projects taking place there.  A second housing market boom took place in Miami from 2012 to present. Along with the over ten thousand residential units added, the downtown area saw a revitalization and an increased prevalence of walking and public transport usage, similar to Manhattan. Miami is sometimes likened to a "southern Manhattan" not only for its high rises, but for its large financial district. Miami is now the US city with the third most skyscrapers (behind New York City and Chicago).

San Francisco

The term "Manhattanization" was initially used to describe the construction of large skyscrapers in San Francisco's Financial District in the 1970s. Since then, tall buildings have proliferated in San Francisco. This has expanded to the South of Market neighborhood. From 2000 to 2018, more than 15 buildings taller than 30 stories were built. This is potentially worrisome as the area where most of the skyscrapers are located is on land with high potential for soil liquefaction.

Santiago

"Sanhattan" has been used as a portmanteau to describe the developed cluster of skyscrapers in Santiago, Chile.

Toronto

Downtown Toronto has experienced a construction boom since 2007, primarily in its development of condominiums and other high rise residential towers. In one week of 2014, Toronto's city council approved 755 stories of new development in the city's downtown core.

Bogotá
The capital city of Colombia has seen skyscraper growth primarily concentrated in the Centro Internacional de Bogotá and Chapinero.

Gallery

See also
 Urban canyon
 Vancouverism

References

Footnotes

Bibliography

History of San Francisco
Urban studies and planning terminology
Culture of Miami
History of Manhattan